Adrienne Hardham  is a professor within the division of Plant Sciences of the Research School of Biology at the Australian National University.

Education
Adrienne Hardham completed a Bachelor of Science at Monash in 1973 and completed her Honours year at the Australian National University (ANU) in 1974. She completed her PhD thesis entitled "Microtubules and morphogenesis in Azolla pinnata roots" in 1978 at the ANU, for which she received the Crawford Medal.

Career
After completing her PhD, Adrienne carried out postdoctoral research at the Research School of Biological Sciences at ANU and Carleton University in Ottawa, Canada. In 1980, Adrienne was awarded a prestigious Australian Research Council Queen Elizabeth II fellowship in the School of Botany at the University of Melbourne. Adrienne returned to the Research School of Biological Sciences at ANU in 1982 as a Research Fellow and progressed to group leader of the Plant Cell Biology group. Upon the establishment of the Research School of Biology at ANU, Adrienne became lab leader of the Plant Pathogens Interactions lab, which uses a range of molecular and microscopy techniques to investigate the infection of plants by Phytophthora and fungal pathogens. Adrienne serves on the editorial boards of Protoplasma and Peer J.

Honours
Adrienne received the Peter Goldacre Award from the Australian Society of Plant Scientists in 1988 and the Gottschalk Medal from the Australian Academy of Science in 1989 for work in biology or medicine by a person under 37. Adrienne was elected as a fellow of the Australian Academy of Science in 1997. In 2002, Adrienne was awarded a Centenary Medal for service to Australian society and science in plant cell biology.

References

Living people
20th-century Australian botanists
Australian phytopathologists
Women phytopathologists
Monash University alumni
Fellows of the Australian Academy of Science
Year of birth missing (living people)
20th-century Australian women scientists
21st-century Australian botanists